Acehnese, the language spoken by the Acehnese people of Aceh, Indonesia,  has a large vowel inventory compared to Indonesian, with ten oral monophthong vowels, twelve oral diphthongs, seven nasal monophthong vowels, and five nasal diphthongs.

Vowels

Native-speaking linguists divide vowels in Acehnese into several categories: oral monophthongs, oral diphthongs (which are further divided into the ones ending with /ə/ and with /i/), nasal monophthongs, and nasal diphthongs.

Oral vowels

Oral monophthong vowels in Acehnese are shown in the table below.

Oral diphthong vowels ending with /ə/ are shown in the table below.

Oral diphthong vowels ending with /i/ are shown in the table below.

Nasal vowels

Nasal monophthong vowels in Acehnese are shown in the table below.

Consonants
The table below shows the Acehnese consonant phonemes and the range of their realizations.

Notes:
Syllable-final k always represents /ʔ/ save in certain recent loans
/f/, /z/, and /ʃ/ are borrowed sounds, and are often replaced by /ph/, /d/, and /ch/ respectively
The nasals  are realized as post-stopped nasals (also called "funny nasals") before oral vowels and consonants. They are distinct from the nasal-stop sequences , e.g. in  'port' vs  'all'.

Orthography

The orthography of Achenese features 31 letters: the 26 letters of the basic Latin alphabet, è, é, ë, ô, and ö.

Notes

References
 

  
 

Acehnese language
Austronesian phonologies